S. Thangavelu (born April 15, 1954) is an Indian politician and the former Member of Parliament in the Rajya Sabha elected from Tamil Nadu representing Dravida Munnetra Kazhagam Party. He had served as a cabinet minister to Chief Minister Dr. M. Karunanidhi in 1989.

Mr. Thangavelu was born to Mr. U. Sangaramoorthy and Mrs. S. Kaliammal in Sankarankovil municipality in the Tirunelveli District.  He had his primary school studies at Gandhi Nagar Municipality School and secondary school studies at Gomathiambal Government Boys High School in Sankarankovil. He went to St. Xavier's College in Palayamkottai for his Pre-University College studies.  He studied Bachelor of Science in Agriculture at the reputed Tamil Nadu Agriculture And Research Institute in Madurai. After graduation, he joined State Agricultural Department as Agricultural Officer and deputed to Karamikudi of Pudukottai district.

In 1984, he resigned from his job to take part in active politics. He contested his first state assembly election in 1984 in Sankarankovil constituency of Tirunelveli District and lost the election by a narrow margin. On March 3, 1986, he was elected as vice-chairman of Sankarankovil municipality and served till March 3, 1991. In 1989 he contested in the Tamil Nadu state assembly election from Sankarankovil (State Assembly Constituency) and won with huge margin. Honorable chief Minister of Tamil Nadu Dr. M. Karunanidhi appointed him in his cabinet as Minister for Hand Loom Department with an additional charge of Minister for  Urban Development Department till 1991. During his ministerial years, Slum Clearance Board, Town Planning Board, Rent Control Board were under his control and he was also served as a chairman of Metropolitan Manila Development Authority (MMDA). On October 25, 1996, he was elected as Sankarankovil Municipality Chairman through public election and severed till October 24, 2001. He was again elected as Sankarankovil Municipality Chairman in 2001 and severed till April 14, 2006. On June 10, 2010, he was elected as  Raiya Sabha MP (Member Of Parliament) from Tamil Nadu through his party Dravida Munnetra Kazhagam (DMK), he took his oath on July 26, 2010, in assembly's first session.

He was always known for his simplicity and humbleness among people. He strongly associated himself to his party Dravida Munnetra Kazhagam (DMK) as Student DMK Member, Tirunelveli District DMK West Representative, Youth Wing Deputy Secretary, State Aathi Dravida Welfare Member(state DMK) and now he is DMK Executive Member.

References

Dravida Munnetra Kazhagam politicians
Living people
1954 births
Rajya Sabha members from Tamil Nadu